Sarsippius' Ark, also referred to as Sarsippius' Ark (Limited Edition), due to its cover, is the second album from Infectious Grooves and was released February 2, 1993. The album features various skits from Mike Muir as the character Sarsippius, the title character of the album. The album reached number 109 on the Billboard 200 charts and number 1 on the Billboard Heatseekers charts that same year. Videos were made for "These Freaks Are Here to Party" and "Three Headed Mind Pollution".

Track listing

Credits

Band members
 Mike Muir – vocals, producer
 Robert Trujillo – bass, producer
 Dean Pleasants – guitar
 Adam Siegel – guitar
 Josh Freese – drums
 Dave Dunn – keyboards

Production staff 
 Mark Dodson – producer
 Tom Fletcher – producer
 Paul Northfield – producer, mixing

Charts

References

Infectious Grooves albums
1993 albums
Epic Records albums
Albums produced by Mark Dodson